A. hastata may refer to:

 Amphisbaena hastata, a worm lizard species found in Brazil
 Arenga hastata, a palm tree species in the genus Arenga
 Atriplex hastata, a plant species in the genus Atriplex

See also
 Hastata (disambiguation)